The Anglo-Russian occupation of Naples was the stationing of British and Russian forces in the Kingdom of Naples from the summer of 1805 until January 1806 during the War of the Third Coalition.

Background 
A previous cooperation in July 1799 between British admiral Horatio Nelson and Russian admiral Ushakov led to the reconquest of Naples and suppression of the pro-French revolutionary Parthenopaean Republic. The war ended with the Treaty of Florence (28 March 1801), in which Naples had to make various concessions to France, including closing its ports to all Ottoman and British ships, giving France preferential treatment in trade, and allowing French garrisons in the Apulian trading ports of Pescara, Brindisi and Otranto and the province of Terra d'Otranto on Neapolitan costs.

For his upcoming confrontation with Austria and Russia in Central Europe in autumn 1805, French Emperor Napoleon sought to secure his southern flank. He was willing to abandon the French-occupied coastal cities in Apulia to Naples in exchange for Neapolitan neutrality in the war ahead. King Ferdinand of Naples and Sicily agreed and signed a treaty with Napoleon.

Course 
However, after receiving the Apulian cities, Ferdinand soon went back on his promise and allied himself with France's enemies Britain and Russia, which landed troops in Naples with his permission in order to guard against a possible French invasion, and to plan an attack on the Napoleonic states in central and northern Italy. The British commander was general James Henry Craig, who had ill health at the time and had 7,000 troops, while the Russian forces were led by Maurice Lacy and Roman Anrep. The combined army was too weak and poorly equipped to withstand any serious French attack.

When the combined Austro–Russian Army was dealt a severe blow by Napoleon at the Battle of Austerlitz on 2 December 1805, 30,000 French troops were freed up for a campaign against Naples. Tsar Alexander I of Russia ordered his troops to withdraw from southern Italy to Corfu, which they did after Lacy received the tsar's dispatch on 7 January 1806. Meanwhile, Craig was awaiting orders from Lord Castlereagh; he wrote on 30 December that he received his most recent instructions on 16 October. Against the wishes of ambassador Hugh Elliot, who warned evacuation would provoke the French to attack, Craig had the vastly outnumbered British troops depart Naples and set sail for the island of Sicily on 10 January 1806, ending the Anglo-Russian occupation and leaving the Neapolitan army to defend the kingdom on its own. The British fleet reached Messina on 22 January and the soldiers disembarked.

British Expeditionary Force
 Lieutenant-General Sir James Henry Craig

Advanced Corps: Brigadier-General John Brodrick
Corsican Rangers (740 men)
Battalion of light infantry
Battalion of grenadiers
Chasseurs Britanniques (645 men)

First Brigade: Brigadier-General Wroth Palmer Acland
20th Regiment of Foot (801 men)
35th Regiment of Foot (1003 men)
61st Regiment of Foot (834 men)

Second Brigade: Brigadier-General Galbraith Lowry Cole
27th Regiment of Foot (1063 men)
58th Regiment of Foot (973 men)
de Watteville's Regiment (725 men)

Royal Artillery (273 men)
2 light brigades
1 heavy brigade (4 howitzers, 4 12-pounders, 8 6-pounders)

Ancillary units
2 squadrons of the 20th Light Dragoons (335 men)
Staff Corps (20 men)
Royal Engineers (19 men)
 Source:

Aftermath 

After Austerlitz, Napoleon rallied his forces to punish Ferdinand's treason and take possession of all of southern Italy. French troops invaded and conquered the kingdom from 8 February to 18 July 1806.

Further reading 
 , Counterpoint to Trafalgar: The Anglo-Russian Invasion of Naples, 1805–1806. (1992). Pp. xi, 198. Columbia: University of South Carolina Press.
 , The War in the Mediterranean, 1803-1810 (1957).

External links 
 Pagedas, Constantine A., 'Counterpoint to Trafalgar: The Anglo-Russian Invasion of Naples, 1805-1806 (review)' in Mediterranean Quarterly, Volume 16, Number 1, Winter 2005, pp. 120–122.

References 

Campaigns of the Napoleonic Wars
Invasions by the United Kingdom
War of the Third Coalition
Military history of Naples
1805 in Italy
Military operations involving the United Kingdom
Military operations involving Russia
Naples
Russian military occupations
1805 in the Kingdom of Naples
19th-century military history of the United Kingdom